Homer Baird Kidwell (October 20, 1911 – December 27, 2000) was an American lawyer. He worked as a corporate attorney in Los Angeles and Honolulu. From July 1, 1975 to February 28, 1979 he served as a justice of the Supreme Court of Hawaii.

Career
Kidwell graduated from Taft College in 1930 and Stanford University in 1935. He worked in Los Angeles for a couple of years before moving to Hawaii in 1937. During the Second World War he served as deputy attorney general of the Territory of Hawaii. From 1975–1979 he was an associate justice of the Supreme Court of Hawaii. In 1979, he retired to teach law at the University of Hawaii.

Personal life
Kidwell married Margaret Greenwell on January 4, 1940. The couple had a son, Alan, and a daughter, Frances.

References

Justices of the Hawaii Supreme Court
1911 births
2000 deaths
Stanford University alumni
Lawyers from Los Angeles
People from Maricopa, California
20th-century American lawyers
20th-century American judges